"You'll Never Find Another Love Like Mine" is a song written by Kenny Gamble and Leon Huff and performed by R&B singer Lou Rawls on his 1976 album All Things in Time. The song proved to be Rawls' breakthrough hit, reaching number one on both the R&B and Easy Listening charts as well as number four on the dance chart and number two on the US Billboard Hot 100. This was the first and only time that one of Rawls' records reached Billboards pop Top Ten. It was the first big hit for Philadelphia International to feature the reformulated MFSB, after many of the original members left Gamble and Huff for better opportunities. The song started Rawls' live shows from 1977 on.

The single went on to sell over a million copies and was certified gold by the RIAA.

Chart performance

Weekly charts

Year-end charts

Cover versions
"You'll Never Find Another Love Like Mine" has been covered by:
Michael Bublé 
Laura Pausini 
Mauro Calderón covered the song in 2008 on his album, Imagine translated and recorded a version of the song. You can see a video of this song recorded in the "Acuario Inbursa" an historic place in Mexico City 
reggae singer John Holt and by the Dub Pistols (who use a sample of John Holt's version) on their Speakers and Tweeters album
jazz saxophonist Stanley Turrentine covered the song on his 1976 album The Man with the Sad Face 
Hank Crawford on his Hank Crawford's Back LP

Later uses
The song can also be heard in the following visual media: 
The Hot Chick (2002)
Father of the Pride (2004)
Guess Who (2005)
Disturbia (2007)
Ice Age: Dawn of the Dinosaurs (2009)
Hit and Run (2012)
’’ Breakout’’(1976)
Veronica Mars (2014), and on the TV sitcoms
My Wife and Kids (2001–2005), in which Lou Rawls himself sings it to Damon Wayans during a colonoscopy,
That '70s Show (1998–2006)
South Park (1997–)
Two and a Half Men (2003–2015)
Psych (2006–2014)
The song could also be heard in an episode of The Proud Family, where Lou Rawls sings and dances with Penny Proud, and on The Proud Family Soundtrack.
Rocco DiSpirito and Karina Smirnoff also danced the rumba to this song in week 2 of season 7 of Dancing with the Stars.
In addition, it was performed by the singer in doll form in an Action League Now! segment on KaBlam!.
Roc episode "The Concert"

See also
 List of number-one R&B singles of 1976 (U.S.)
 List of number-one adult contemporary singles of 1976 (U.S.)

References

1976 singles
1976 songs
Number-one singles in South Africa
Lou Rawls songs
Philadelphia International Records singles
Songs written by Kenny Gamble
Songs written by Leon Huff